Maria Young may refer to:
 Maria Young Dougall (1849-1935), American suffragist and LDS member
Polly Young (1749-1799), also known as Maria Young, English singer